Zoltán Adorján (born 15 November 1961 in Debrecen, Hungary) is former international motorcycle speedway rider. He is a 13 times Hungarian national champion.

Career
Adorján came to prominence when he reached the 1985 Individual Speedway World Championship final. Four years later in 1989 he won the Continental Speedway Final on the way to reaching his second World final.

The following year he teamed up with Sándor Tihanyi to secure a first medal at world level for Hungary when they won a bronze at the 1990 Speedway World Pairs Championship in Germany.

On 30 July 1995, he won the Continental Final, which formed part of the 1996 Speedway Grand Prix Qualification. It was the second time he had won the final having previously won it in 1989. In 1996, he won the Argentine Championship.

World Final Appearances

Individual World Championship
 1985 -  Bradford, Odsal Stadium - 14th - 2pts
 1989 -  München, Olympiastadion - 15th - 4pts
 1990 -  Bradford, Odsal Stadium - 16th - 2pts

World Pairs Championship
 1988 -  Bradford, Odsal Stadium (with Antal Kocso) - 6th - 25pts
 1989 -  Leszno, Alfred Smoczyk Stadium (with Antal Kocso) - 6th - 22pts
 1990 -  Landshut, Ellermühle Stadium (with Sándor Tihanyi) - 3rd - 37pts 
 1993 -  Vojens, Speedway Center (with József Petrikovics / Antal Kocso) - 7th - 10pts

See also
 Hungary national speedway team

References

Living people
Hungarian speedway riders
1961 births